Brazil is the 13th-largest video game market in the world as of 2021, and the largest in Latin America, with a revenue of 1.3 billion US dollars. Video games were not permitted for import into Brazil until the 1990s, and were then heavily taxed as non-essential goods. As a result, a grey market developed around pirating games, driven by the lack of official channels for purchasing games. Many game companies avoided expansion into the country for these reasons until 2009. An exception was Sega, which retained a strong foothold in the country with the Master System and Mega Drive. Blaming high tariffs, Nintendo officially left the market in 2015, but returned in 2017, though Nintendo actually returned in 2020 with Nintendo Switch. In a three-episode series named Red Bull Parallels, Red Bull explored the country's relation with gaming.

Censorship
In January 2008, the marketing of Counter-Strike was prohibited in the Brazilian territory by judicial decision. The judge argued that Counter-Strike and EverQuest games subvert social order.

It has since been lifted, although EverQuest is still illegal in physical form in Minas Gerais.

Video game development
Video game development exists in Brazil since as early as 1983, when Renato Degiovani developed the first computer games in Portuguese called "Aventuras na Selva" (later renamed Amazônia) and "Aeroporto 83" (Airport 83) for a computer specialized magazine called "Micro Sistemas". Several years have passed with little to no significant development until the 2000s, when several companies started creating advergames and/or MMORPGs, and universities started offering game development degrees. Hoplon was one of the first to be successful in the industry with Taikodom.

The 2010s have been marked by a growing number of studios getting bigger relevance with proprietary indie game titles. The BIG Festival (Brazilian Independent Games Festival) was conceived in 2012 and is held every year in São Paulo, gathering game industry professionals from the country and abroad and promoting indie titles for the Brazilian market.

The biggest game dev scenes are from São Paulo, Porto Alegre and Brasília.

Game developers from Brazil

Defunct game developers from Brazil

Game publishers from Brazil

Defunct game publishers from Brazil

Media
Print Media
 EGM Brasil, since 2002
 Nintendo World, since 1998
 Revista Xbox 360, since 2008

Brazilian video game rating
The ClassInd (advisory rating) is the institute responsible for the software given for review on Brazil.

See also
 Jogo Justo, an initiative to have tariffs on video games lowered
 Latin American communities and video games

References

External links
 ABRAGAMES (Brazilian Association of Game Developers) 
 Brazil Games Export Program (Also includes ABRAGAMES section. Check newsletters page under Information tab for company details.) 
 ACIGAMES (Commercial, Industrial and Cultural Gaming Association) 
 ADJOGOSRS (Associação dos Desenvolvedores de Jogos Digitais do Rio Grande do Sul)